Son of a Sailor is a 1933 American comedy film directed by Lloyd Bacon and written by Alfred A. Cohn, Paul Gerard Smith, Ernest Pagano, and H. M. Walker. The film stars Joe E. Brown, Jean Muir, Frank McHugh, Thelma Todd, Johnny Mack Brown, and Sheila Terry. The film was released by Warner Bros. on December 23, 1933.

Plot

Cast       
Joe E. Brown as 'Handsome' Callahan
Jean Muir as Helen Farnsworth
Frank McHugh as 'Gaga'
Thelma Todd as The Baroness
Johnny Mack Brown as 'Duke'
Sheila Terry as Genevieve
George Blackwood as Armstrong
Merna Kennedy as Isabel
Kenneth Thomson as Williams
Samuel S. Hinds as Admiral Farnsworth 
Noel Francis as Queenie
Arthur Vinton as Vincent
George Irving as Rear Admiral Lee
Garry Owen as Sailor Johnson

Home media

References

External links

1933 films
1930s English-language films
American comedy films
1933 comedy films
First National Pictures films
Warner Bros. films
Films directed by Lloyd Bacon
American black-and-white films
1930s American films